St. Luke's Medical Center – Global City is a hospital at the Bonifacio Global City in Taguig, Metro Manila, Philippines. It is the sister facility of the hospital of the same name in Quezon City. Both are affiliated with the Episcopal Church of the Philippines.

History
The hospital at the Bonifacio Global City is an offshoot of the hospital of the same name in Quezon City which was established in 1903. On January 16, 2010, the hospital was inaugurated by then President Gloria Macapagal Arroyo.

Architecture and design

A joint venture between First Balfour and Makati Development Corporation was involved in the construction of the hospital. Upon its inauguration the health facility hosts a 14-storey nursing tower with a capacity of 600 beds, a helipad and a podium, along with an 11-storey medical arts building which can house clinics for 374 doctors and a ground floor with lobbies described as "hotel-like", and a multi-level parking with at least 1,000 parking slots.

Facilities
The hospital hosts 10 institutes dedicated to cancer, digestive and liver diseases, eyes, neurosciences, orthopedics and sports medicine, pathology, pediatrics and child care, pulmonary medicines, and radiology. It also has 18 operating rooms, five delivery rooms, imaging suites, ancillary outpatient services, critical care units, catheterization laboratory, OB-gynecology complex and post anesthetic care units.
The center in Global City houses 10 institutes for the heart, cancer, neurosciences, digestive and liver diseases, eyes, orthopedics and sports medicine, pathology, pediatrics and child care, pulmonary medicines and radiology.

Reception
United States based magazine, Healthcare Management News and Insights, list St. Lukes Medical Center - Global City as part of its "World’s Most Beautiful Hospitals" on its March 2012 issue where the hospital was ranked 11th out of the 25 listed. The hospitals were rated by the magazine's editors according to their  interior and exterior features, as well as their "health-promoting" features. St. Lukes was only one of the three Asian hospitals on the list.

References

External links

 Official Website of St. Luke's Medical Center (Global City)

Hospitals in Metro Manila
Hospital buildings completed in 2010
Protestant hospitals in the Philippines
Bonifacio Global City
21st-century architecture in the Philippines